Harry Bugin (March 10, 1929 – October 6, 2005) was an American film, stage and television actor and musician.

Life and career
Born in the Bronx, New York City, the son of Isidore and Sadie Bugin, and brother to Ruth Bugin, he was a graduate of the New York Public School system and a graduate of the American Academy of Dramatic Arts in New York City. Bugin played a number of musical instruments including the bass, guitar, tuba, and others. In 1957 he married the former Aphrodite Manickas of Pawtucket, RI in New York City, at which time Mrs. Bugin began a career in advertising spanning 30 years. They resided in Jackson Heights, NY until his death.

In addition to a long and accomplished film career, Harry Bugin was also a professional musician (string bass, bass guitar) with top "Big Bands" from 1947–1970, including: Glenn Miller (with Ray McKinley) on the 1960s, Tex Beneke (1956/57), Ray McKinley (1960s), Vaughn Monroe (1960s), Sammy Kaye (1960s). Harry Bugin's stage credits include 1974's Twigs (with Vivian Blaine), and 12 Angry Men.

Partial filmography

 The Man Who Saw Tomorrow (1981) - Warlord's Aide
 The Last American Virgin (1982) - Doctor
 The Day After (1983, TV Movie) - Man at phone (uncredited)
 Pennies From Heaven (1984) - Dancer
 Going Under Cover (1985) - Harry Hargreaves
 America's Most Wanted (1989, TV Series) - Aniello Dellacroce
 Miller's Crossing (1990) - Rooster (gangster)
 Barton Fink (1991) - Pete
 Mac (1992) - Patient
 Night of the City (1993) - Fight Promoter
 For Love or Money (1993) - Joey Pickles
 The Hudsucker Proxy (1994) - Aloysius
 City Hall (1996) - Morty the Waiter
 Sudden Manhattan (1997) - Gran'pa Pete
 Destination Anywhere (1997, Video) - Bartender
 The Big Lebowski (1998) - Arthur Digby Sellers
 Joe Gould's Secret (2000) - Newsman
 Game 6 (2005) - Dodgie (final film role)

Music
Bugin performed with people such:

 Glenn Miller
 Ray McKinley (1960s)
 Tex Beneke (1956/57)
 Ray McKinley (1960s)
 Vaughn Monroe (1960s)
 Sammy Kaye (1960s)

Theatre
 Twigs 1974 - Swede (National Tour)
 12 Angry Men - Juror # 10 - Rita Hayworth Theatre

References

External links
 

American male film actors
American male stage actors
Male actors from New York City
1929 births
2005 deaths
People from the Bronx
20th-century American male actors